"Little Lies" is a song by British-American rock band Fleetwood Mac from their 14th studio album, Tango in the Night (1987). It was written by band member Christine McVie and her then-husband, Eddy Quintela, with lead vocals performed primarily by McVie, although the chorus features backing vocals by Lindsey Buckingham and Stevie Nicks. The song was released in August 1987 by Warner Bros. Records, as the third single from Tango in the Night.

On its release, the single reached number one for four weeks on the US Billboard Adult Contemporary chart and number four on the Billboard Hot 100 in November 1987. To date, it is their most recent top-ten hit in the United States. The single also reached number five on the UK Singles Chart. "Little Lies" continues to be played on radio stations as a classic hit of the late 1980s, along with "Everywhere" and "Seven Wonders", both of which are from Tango in the Night. "Little Lies" was also accompanied by a music video, filmed on a farm, in and around its rustic buildings and fields.

The single was also available on the 12" single format, featuring an extended dance version, a dub version and its B-side, "Ricky", a non-album track penned by McVie and Buckingham. A limited 12" picture disc was also released in the United Kingdom, and it was the first Fleetwood Mac single to be issued on the cassette single format.

Cash Box said that "McVie's songwriting ability combined with Lindsey Buckingham's production assistance provide a extremely likeable hit-to-be."

Track listing and formats
 US 12" vinyl single (Warner Bros. Records 0-20761)
"Little Lies" (Extended version) – 6:07
"Little Lies" (Dub version) – 4:04
"Ricky" – 4:21

 UK 7" vinyl single (Warner Bros. Records W 8291)
"Little Lies"  – 3:38
"Ricky" – 4:21

Personnel
 Christine McVie – lead and backing vocals, keyboards
 Lindsey Buckingham – guitars, keyboards, Fairlight CMI, backing vocals
 Stevie Nicks – backing vocals
 John McVie – bass
 Mick Fleetwood – drums, percussion

Charts

Weekly charts

Year-end charts

Certifications and sales

Hilary Duff version

Hilary Duff recorded a cover of the song, produced by Peer Åström and Adam Anders, in promotion of the second season of her TV Land comedy series, Younger. It was released January 13, 2016 through RCA Records and Sony Music Entertainment.

Background and recording
"TV Land called me," Duff told People, "They were like, 'We want you to cover a song for the promos for the second season.' And I’m like, 'Oh my God. Yes, of course, I would love to.'" A preview of her rendition of the song was made available through the magazine in December 2015. The recording was produced by Peer Åström and Adam Anders, with vocal engineering and production from Alex Anders, the same team responsible for the music behind the popular Fox musical comedy-drama, Glee.

Duff's recording has been described as synthpop, with additional influences of dance genres, especially dubstep.

Critical reception
Duff's genre-altering recording of "Little Lies" has received mixed reviews from critics. "This cover doesn’t work for me," writes Mike Wass of Idolator, "The plodding electronic production ... completely overwhelms Fleetwood Mac’s delicate Tango In The Night smash and makes the "Sparks" diva sound like Siri's older sister." However, Lucas Villa of AXS TV was more complimentary, writing that Duff "rises above the synths to emerge as the dance floor queen she's been since the release of her 2007 album, Dignity."

Release history

References

The Billboard Book of Top 40 Hits, 6th Edition, 1996

External links
 

1987 singles
1987 songs
Fleetwood Mac songs
Songs written by Christine McVie
Song recordings produced by Richard Dashut
Music videos directed by Dominic Sena
Songs written by Eddy Quintela
Warner Records singles
Hilary Duff songs
RCA Records singles
Sony Music singles
1980s ballads
Number-one singles in Poland
Rock ballads